The legislative branch of government in West Bengal consists of:

 the West Bengal Legislative Assembly, and
 the Governor of West Bengal

Legislative Council
Between 1935 and 1969 the state legislature of West Bengal also had an upper house, the West Bengal Legislative Council which was consequently abolished in 1969.

Bicameral legislatures
Legislature
State legislatures of India